Sakra is a 2023 wuxia film directed by Donnie Yen, who also co-produced the film with Wong Jing. It is adapted from the wuxia novel Demi-Gods and Semi-Devils written by Jin Yong. The film stars Donnie Yen, Chen Yuqi, and Cya Liu, and it was released in OTT platforms in China at 2023 Chinese New Year. It was also released in theatres in Malaysia on 16 January 2023.

Plot 
As a baby, Khitan-born Qiao Feng loses his parents and is sent to be raised by a couple from the Song Empire, which is at war with the Khitan-led Liao Empire. He grows up and becomes the powerful chief of the Beggars' Sect, utilizing martial arts in battles. However, he is framed for the murder of deputy chief Ma Dayuan by his wife Kang Min, and is kicked out from the sect after they discover his origin. He is soon framed for the murders of his parents and Xuanku, one of the sect's elders, when he finds their corpses; after the latter's murder, a fight ensues between Qiao Feng and the Beggars' Sect. He escapes while saving Morong servant Azhu, who was ordered to steal the Sect's Yijin Jing.

Due to Azhu being heavily injured, Qiao Feng takes her to be healed by doctor Xue Muhua, with the two growing closer on the way. However, once they arrive at the Heroes Gathering Manor, they are rejected; to prove his dedication for Azhu, Qiao Feng decides to sacrifice his life to save hers. After Qiao Feng drinks with the Beggars' Sect to sever ties, he fights against them. Near the end of the battle, a wounded Qiao Feng is saved by a mysterious person who kills most of the assailants.

Azhu is healed by Xue Muhua, who intends to keep her until Qiao Feng returns. Azhu ends up escaping, burning down Xue Muhua's medical station in the process. Meanwhile, Qiao Feng starts to question his morality and origin after killing Song soldiers to save Khitan citizens during a sandstorm. Qiao Feng and Azhu soon reunite, professing their love for each other. Qiao Feng, who has renamed himself to Xiao Feng to reflect his true nationality, starts to search for the "Leading Big Brother", who was responsible for the ambush that killed his parents when he was a baby. Azhu goes undercover as Bai Shijing, the true murderer of Ma Dayuan, and talks to Kang Min, who serves as his co-conspirator. Seeing through Azhu's disguise, she lies to her and tells her that Dali emperor Duan Zhengchun is the Leading Big Brother.

Xiao Feng and Azhu head to Mirror Lake, where they learn that he has conceived several children with several wives, with Azhu being one of the children. Upon learning this, Azhu stops Xiao Feng from killing Duan Zhengchun by disguising herself as him, causing him to accidentally kill her. While mourning Azhu's death, Duan Zhengchun tells Xiao Feng that he is not the Leading Big Brother.

Xiao Feng, who ends up being accompanied by Azhu's sister Azi, confronts Bai Shijin and Kang Min. Soon, Murong family head Murong Fu and his army arrive, killing Bai Shijin and Kang Min. Xiao Feng fights Murong Fu while Azi fends off the army. At one point in the battle, Xiao Feng ends up nearly losing consciousness, but is able to get up and defeat Murong Fu after remembering his Buddha teachings when he was young. With the battle over, Azi and the arriving Beggars' Sect members watch as Xiao Feng rides away.

Some time later, Xiao Feng lives a peaceful life herding cattle, as he promised Azhu they would do. Meanwhile, Murong Fu is revived by his father Murong Bu, who later visits Xiao Yuanshan, Xiao Feng's biological father, who survived the Leading Big Brother's attack, abandoned Xiao Feng, murdered Xiao Feng's adoptive parents and Xuanku, and saved Xiao Feng from the fight at the Heroes Gathering Manor.

Cast

 Donnie Yen as Qiao Feng
 Yen also played the role of Xiao Yuanshan, Qiao Feng's biological father.
 Chen Yuqi as Azhu
 Cya Liu as Azi
 Kara Wai as Ruan Xingzhu 
 Wu Yue as Murong Fu
 Eddie Cheung as Duan Zhengchun
 Grace Wong as Kang Min
 Du Yuming as Bai Shijing
 Ray Lui as Murong Bo
 Michelle Hu as Mrs Xiao
 Tsui Siu-ming as Jiu Mozhi
 Cai Xiangyu as Abi
 Zhao Huawei as Duan Yu
 Yu Kang as Yu Jou
 Xu Xiangdong as Xuan Nan
 Yuen Cheung-yan as Xue Muhua

Production
Principal photography for the film started on 27 July 2022 and concluded in October 2022. In April 2022, the film was registered as a "web-distributed film" in China National Radio and Television Administration. In May 2022, the first concept poster was released during the 2022 Cannes Film Festival. The production crew was also announced, including Donnie Yen as the director, producer and lead cast. In July 2022, Cya Liu indicated that she would join the cast during the interview with Oriental Daily News. In August 2022, Grace Wong posted a photo on social media, showing herself wearing a Sakra T-shirt at Hengdian World Studios. In September 2022, a behind-the-scene video clip showing Donnie Yen and Chen Yuqi was released. In October 2022, the film ended filming, and moved on to post-production.

Release
In December 2022, it was announced that the film was scheduled for release in theatres in Malaysia on 16 January 2023.

Notes

References

External links
 
 
 
 
 

2023 films
2023 action films
Films based on Demi-Gods and Semi-Devils
Wuxia films